Adams is a neighborhood in Seattle, Washington. The city's Department of Neighborhoods places Adams on the south side of Ballard.

References

Ballard, Seattle